Huron are an English thrash metal band  formed in Plymouth in late 2007. They released their first studio album, Cheyne Stoking, in June 2009 on Rising Records. The band have garnered positive critical attention for their live performances. They released their fourth studio recording The Dead Stay Dead in February 2016.

Biography
Huron were signed in 2008 by Rising Records UK. Their debut album titled Cheyne Stoking came out in 2009 and received glowing reviews from the international music press with a KKKK in Kerrang! and 8/10 in Rock Sound. In May 2009 Bruce Dickinson played the track "Break Your Neck" and talked about the album on his BBC radio show. Huron then toured the UK extensively with bands including Valient Thorr and Viking Skull and got their first festival booking with the Clive Aid Festival along with Marshall Law and Praying Mantis. Huron continued touring the UK and eventually got booked for the Hellfire Festival along with Saxon, Anvil and Fields of the Nephilim. During 2010 Huron were booked to play the Hammerfest II festival along with Devil Driver, Suicidal Tendencies, Orange Goblin and Iced Earth.

After a successful tour and debut festivals Huron went into the studio to start recording their second album, Mary Celeste, released worldwide through Casket Records UK on 30 May 2011. This album was very well received and achieved 7/10 with Metal Hammer. 2011 saw Huron play Hard Rock Hell V The Metal Gods Festival which finished of a very productive year.
In 2011, after a successful tour and debut festivals Huron went into the studio to start recording their second album titled Mary Celeste which was released worldwide on 30 May 2011. The reviews from the international press were strong with a solid 7/10 in the Metal Hammer magazine. The momentum started building with their music being played on Total Rock Radio, Planet Rock and a host of others from all over Europe and the US. Towards the end of 2011, Huron were booked to play Hard Rock Hell V sharing stage 2 with acts Sanity Days, Warbringer and Hellfighter.

2012 saw the release of their anticipated third release War Party, released as a promotion tool for fans and the music industry this EP received 7/10 and a glowing review from Adam Rees of the Metal Hammer magazine. Apart from various supporting slots in 2012 Huron went on to also play three festivals : The Download Festival, 7 June, The Bulldog Bash, 10 August and the Bloodstock Festival, 12 August.

War Party, a 4 track promo CD, was self-released and was reviewed in the August 2012 edition of the Metal Hammer..."The Title says it all! The Brutish grooves and snarling attitude on Bite The Kerb and Mercy Killing are suitably belligerent, with choruses to put Huron on the radar of Five Finger Death Punch Fans!" 7/10 Adam Rees 2012.

Shows with Evile, Onslaught and Alestorm made 2012 their busiest year to date with the Download Festival.

A UK Tour with Skindred took place in December 2012.

Between 2013 and 2015, the band focused on writing and recording its fourth studio release The Dead Stay Dead. Concert appearances were limited aside from some charity shows, the odd small festival and a support slot with Ill Niño. The new album artwork for The Dead Stay Dead was created by Mark Rudolph. The Dead Stay Dead was mixed and mastered by Justin Hill of the UK metal band SikTh.

Festivals to date
The Clive Aid Festival 2008 
Rock Fest 2008
The Hellfire Festival 2009 
Hammerfest II 2010 
Devon Rox Festival 2011 
Hard Rock Hell V 2011 (Stage 2)
Cradle Will Rock Festival 2011 
Metal Gods Festival 2011 
Big Red Bash Festival 2011 
Download Festival 2012 (Takeover Stage)
Bulldog Bash Festival 2012 
Bloodstock Festival 2012 (New Blood Stage)
Rock & Metal Circus Festival 2013
Hammerfest VI (Main Stage) 2014 Out OF The Ashes Festival 2014 Thrashasaurus Festival 2015 Download Festival 2015 (Headlining Take Over Stage) Rock Diabestes 2015

Members
 Dave Israelite Parsons (drums)
 Rimmy Sinclair (guitar)
 Chris Smith (guitar)
 Rohan James (bass/vocals)
 Sean Palmer (vocals)

Former members
 Neil Sims (guitar)
 Steve Wile (drums)
 Damian Diablo (drums ex Three Dice)
 Rory Conroy (drums)
 Steve Sampson (guitar)
 Phil Griffin (bass)
 Chris Newman (bass)

Discography
 Filthy Sex Metal Promo 8 track EP
 Cheyne Stoking (2009)
 Mary Celeste (2011)
 War Party EP (2012)
 The Eternal Sea (2015)
 The Dead Stay Dead (2016)

References

External links
 

English heavy metal musical groups